Slobodan Slović (born 9 February 1975) is a Serbian football manager and former player.

Playing career
Slović started out at his hometown club Borac Čačak, helping them win the Second League of FR Yugoslavia in the 1993–94 season and earn promotion to the First League of FR Yugoslavia. He was transferred to Železnik in the 1997 winter transfer window. After his consistent performances in the 1997–98 season, Slović secured a move to Red Star Belgrade. He, however, failed to make an impact with the team and quickly returned to Železnik. In the summer of 2001, Slović moved abroad to Slovenia and played briefly for Korotan Prevalje, before returning to Železnik once again.

After a brief spell at his parent club Borac Čačak, Slović moved abroad for the second time and signed with Belgian First Division side Cercle Brugge in June 2004. He was loaned to Belgian Second Division club Royal Antwerp in January 2008. At the end of the season, Slović terminated his contract with Cercle Brugge and signed with Royal Antwerp on a permanent basis. He signed a contract with Belgian Third Division side Cappellen in August 2009.

Managerial career
In 2012, Slović served as player-manager of Serbian League Belgrade club Hajduk Beograd.

Honours
Borac Čačak
 Second League of FR Yugoslavia: 1993–94

References

External links
 
 

1975 births
Living people
Sportspeople from Čačak
Serbia and Montenegro footballers
Serbian footballers
Association football midfielders
FK Borac Čačak players
FK Železnik players
Red Star Belgrade footballers
NK Korotan Prevalje players
Cercle Brugge K.S.V. players
Royal Antwerp F.C. players
Royal Cappellen F.C. players
FK Inđija players
FK Hajduk Beograd players
FK Sopot players
Second League of Serbia and Montenegro players
First League of Serbia and Montenegro players
Slovenian PrvaLiga players
Belgian Pro League players
Challenger Pro League players
Belgian Third Division players
Serbian SuperLiga players
Serbia and Montenegro expatriate footballers
Serbian expatriate footballers
Expatriate footballers in Slovenia
Expatriate footballers in Belgium
Serbia and Montenegro expatriate sportspeople in Slovenia
Serbia and Montenegro expatriate sportspeople in Belgium
Serbian expatriate sportspeople in Belgium
Serbian football managers